Grancanaridion is a monotypic genus of  comb-footed spiders containing the single species, Grancanaridion grancanariense. It was first described by J. Wunderlich in 2011, and is found on the Canary Islands.

See also
 List of Theridiidae species

References

Monotypic Araneomorphae genera
Spiders of the Canary Islands
Theridiidae